Hauraki-Waikato is a New Zealand parliamentary Māori electorate first established for the . It largely replaced the  electorate.

Population centres
The electorate includes the following population centres:

Within the Auckland Region: Papakura, Pukekohe, Waiuku, Clarks Beach, Ramarama, Bombay, Pōkeno.

Within the Waikato region: Meremere, Huntly, Whitianga, Whangamatā, Thames, Paeroa, Waihi, Hamilton, Ngāruawāhia, Morrinsville, Matamata, Cambridge, Te Awamutu, Raglan, Kawhia.

In the 2007 boundary redistribution, the Tainui electorate was reduced in size by transferring the tribal area of Ngāti Maniapoto to the Te Tai Hauāuru electorate, and in the process, the electorate was renamed as Hauraki-Waikato. The electorate saw no boundary adjustment in the 2013/14 redistribution. 

In 2020, following the relatively higher population growth in the Hauraki-Waikato electorate than that of Tāmaki Makaurau, Hauraki-Waikato's northern boundary was contracted to east of Manurewa. Following an objection raised by the Labour Party which emphasised Waiheke Island's ferry connections to Auckland, the island was moved to Tāmaki Makaurau.

Tribal areas
The electorate includes the following tribal areas: Ngāi Tai, Ngāti Huia, Ngāti Mahuta, Ngāti Maru, Ngāti Paoa, Ngāti Raukawa, Ngāti Tamaterā, Ngāti Te Ata, Waikato-Tainui, Ngāti Porou ki Hauraki

History
The electorate was originally proposed by Elections New Zealand as "Pare Hauraki-Pare Waikato" to even out the numbers on the voting roll in Tainui and Te Tai Hauauru. Labour's Nanaia Mahuta won the  against Angeline Greensill of the Māori Party.

Members of Parliament
Key

Election results

2020 election

2017 election

2014 election

2011 election

Electorate (as at 26 November 2011): 33,215

2008 election

Notes

References

Māori electorates
Politics of Waikato
2008 establishments in New Zealand